Carillon is a recitation with orchestral accompaniment written by the English composer Edward Elgar as his Op. 75, in 1914. The words are by the Belgian poet Émile Cammaerts.

It was first performed in the Queen's Hall, London, on 7 December 1914, with the recitation by Cammaerts' wife Tita Brand, and the orchestra conducted by the composer.

The work was performed in January 1915 at the London Coliseum with Henry Ainley, and at Harrogate on 28 August 1915, with the soprano the Hon. Mrs. Julian Clifford and a military band. The band arrangement was by Percy Fletcher.

On 15 August 1918, Carillon and Le drapeau belge were performed with success at a popular concert in Prospect Park, Brooklyn, with the recitations by the Belgian dramatic artist Carlo Liten.

History

History records the reasons why Germany invaded and occupied "neutral" Belgium in August 1914, and the horrific events which followed when Belgium showed armed resistance: cities and people were destroyed, and the country put to almost complete ruin.  King Albert and his army resisted but were quickly forced back to West Flanders on the Flemish side of the country. There was much national sympathy: in London, at Christmas, a patriotic anthology called King Albert's Book ("A tribute to the Belgian King and people from representative men and women throughout the world") was organised by Hall Caine with contributions from leading artists, writers and musicians. Elgar was asked to contribute, and he remembered reading in The Observer a poem by Émile Cammaerts. Cammaerts was married to Tita Brand, the daughter of the singer Marie Brema who had sung in the first performance of Elgar's Dream of Gerontius, and Elgar had her immediate approval for the use of the poem.

Elgar's friend and candid biographer, Rosa Burley, recalled:

Elgar took Miss Burley's advice, and set the poem as narratives and recitatives interspersed with orchestral interludes.

Miss Burley was present at the premiere by Tita Brand at Queen's Hall, and related how it had to be arranged for her state to be hidden from the audience:

The version for voice with piano accompaniment was published, with the French words only,  in King Albert's Book.

Music

An obvious characteristic of the music is the downward scale of four notes in the bass (B, A, G, F), which is a repeated accompaniment (ostinato) through the whole of the introduction before the first words are recited. The work is written in a triple metre. The opening tune is confident and waltz-like, and the accents of the scale motif, like a repeated peal of church bells, never coincide with the natural waltz rhythm: it is the three-pulse of the waltz against the four of the bell motif.  When the bell motif is not in the bass it is found elsewhere, high up, having changed places with a brilliant passage of triplets now in the bass.  When the music does stop, it is a call for attention to the spoken poem.

Elgar's vigorous waltz-like tune is memorable, is in effect a song without words; and his orchestration perfectly appropriate.  Both words and music are powerful, and the work succeeds remarkably by their contrast and support of each other.

Lyrics
 
The original words are in French, with the English translation by Tita Brand.

The recitation starts after an orchestral introduction.

Recordings
Elgar: War Music Richard Pascoe (narrator), Barry Collett (conductor), Rutland Sinfonia
 The CD with the book Oh, My Horses! Elgar and the Great War has many historical recordings including two of Carillon: a 1915 recording with Henry Ainley (speaker) and an orchestra conducted by Elgar, and a 1975 recording with Alvar Lidell and the Kensington Symphony Orchestra conducted by Leslie Head

References

Caine, Hall (ed.), King Albert's Book, a Tribute to the Belgian King and People from representative men and women throughout the World (The Daily Telegraph, in conjunction with The Daily Sketch, The Glasgow Herald and Hodder & Stoughton, Christmas 1914)  "Sold in aid of the Daily Telegraph Belgian Fund."
Banfield, Stephen, Sensibility and English Song: Critical studies of the early 20th century (Cambridge University Press, 1985) 

Kennedy, Michael, Portrait of Elgar (Oxford University Press, 1968) 
Moore, Jerrold N. “Edward Elgar: a creative life” (Oxford University Press, 1984)

Notes

Compositions by Edward Elgar
1914 compositions